Andreas Müller (Erfurt, 22 February 1971) is a paralympic athlete from Germany competing mainly in category F34 throws events.

Andreas competed in all three throws in the class C5 at the 1992 Summer Paralympics in Barcelona but did not manage to win any medals.  In 1996 Summer Paralympics he won the F32-33 discus and won the silver in F32-33 shot put.  In 2000 he won a second silver in the F34 discus.

References

Paralympic athletes of Germany
Athletes (track and field) at the 1992 Summer Paralympics
Athletes (track and field) at the 1996 Summer Paralympics
Athletes (track and field) at the 2000 Summer Paralympics
Paralympic gold medalists for Germany
Paralympic silver medalists for Germany
Living people
1971 births
Sportspeople from Erfurt
Medalists at the 1992 Summer Paralympics
Medalists at the 1996 Summer Paralympics
Medalists at the 2000 Summer Paralympics
Paralympic medalists in athletics (track and field)
German male discus throwers
German male javelin throwers
German male shot putters
20th-century German people